Stéphane Operto (born 25 November 1966) is a Monegasque former cyclist. He competed in the road race at the 1988 Summer Olympics.

References

External links
 

1966 births
Living people
Monegasque male cyclists
Olympic cyclists of Monaco
Cyclists at the 1988 Summer Olympics
Place of birth missing (living people)